Maria del Pilar Cordero (March 1, 1910 – August 2, 1998), better known as Mapy Cortés, was a Puerto Rican actress and dancer who participated in many films during the Golden Age of Mexican cinema, where she became one of the industry's most beloved and bankable stars of the 1940s.

Biography
Mapy Cortés began experimenting as an actress since an early age, working in Puerto Rican amateur theater. In 1932 Mapy traveled to New York City and married childhood friend Fernando "Papi" Cortés. Under contract to a theatrical troupe headlined by Dominican baritone Eduardo Brito, the couple traveled to Spain. After the company disbanded, the couple began performing in different teatro de revista companies, primarily in Barcelona. Mapy Cortés made her film debut as one of the two female leads in the comedy Dos Mujeres y un Don Juan (Two Women and a Don Juan, 1933). By that time Cortés had a nephew, Paquito Cordero, who would become a famed actor and producer in Puerto Rico.

After the start of the Spanish Civil War, Mapy and Fernando Cortés went to Marseilles before making their way down to Argentina. Following stops in Buenos Aires and Havana, where they appeared on stage and movies, the couple traveled to Mexico City. They made their stage debut as part of the Cantinflas revue and soon joined the growing Mexican film industry, which lacked established female stars. Back-to-back starring roles in three hit films - the Pan-American musical La liga de las canciones / The League of Songs (Chano Urueta, 1941), the nostalgia musical comedy ¡Ay, qué tiempos, señor don Simón! / Oh, What Times, Don Simon! (Julio Bracho, 1941) and the Cantinflas comedy El gendarme desconocido / The Unknown Policeman (Miguel M. Delgado, 1941) - quickly turned Mapy Cortés into one of the most bankable leading ladies in Mexican cinema. Mapy also appeared in the U.S. State Department propaganda short film Mexican Moods. The short shows the couple performing at the luxurious Hotel Reforma in Mexico City circa 1941, when Mapy performed as part of the hotel's dinner show and Fernando acted as master of ceremonies. In the short, Mapy sings the Rafael Hernández song "Nada" (Nothing), which the couple later performed in the 1966 film Luna de miel en Puerto Rico as part of a tribute to the recently deceased composer. 

In 1942, Cortés made her only foray into Hollywood cinema, playing a singer in the RKO wartime musical comedy Seven Days' Leave. Her eponymous character is engaged to Victor Mature's soldier character before he falls in love with a socialite played by Lucille Ball. After filming Seven Days Leave, Mapy Cortés returned to Mexico City and played top-billed roles in contemporary romantic comedies and nostalgia musicals set during the Mexican Belle Époque. The 1945 Mapy Cortés vehicle La pícara Susana / Mischievous Susana  marked the directorial debut of her husband Fernando, who remained very active as a comedy director in Mexican film and TV until his death in 1979, directing vehicles for popular Mexican comedians like Tin-Tan, Resortes, and la India Maria. 

While Fernando's demand as journeyman comedy director grew, Mapy's film career waned in the early 1950s with the rise of a younger generation of vedettes, rumberas and musical comedy stars. The couple received an invitation from Ángel Ramos, owner of El Mundo Enterprises, to help launch WKAQ-TV Telemundo Channel 2. On March 28, 1954, Puerto Rico received its first television transmission from Telemundo: a live broadcast of the Spanish comedy El caso de la mujer asesinadita, starring Mapy and directed by Fernando. The couple also starred in the station's first comedy show Mapy y Papi, an adaptation of the I Love Lucy format that also featured Maria Judith Franco and Mapy's nephew Paquito Cordero. Despite their success in Puerto Rican television, the couple decided to return to Mexico City, where they starred in a Mexican version of Mapy y Papi.

Her niece Mapita Cortés had been living with the couple in Mexico City and she briefly joined the Mexican film industry after becoming Miss Puerto Rico 1957. After an eight-year absence from films, Mapy Cortés co-starred in the comedy Dormitorio para señoritas / Girls' Dormitory (1959), a loose remake of her 1943 hit Internado para señoritas / Girls' Dormitory (1943), starring Mapita and directed by Fernando. However, Mapita quickly retired from showbiz after marrying the popular Chilean crooner Lucho Gatica and only briefly returned many years later, as part of the Mexican telenovela industry. 

By the 1960s, Mapy Cortés was working mostly on the Mexico City stage, often starring in comedies by Spanish author Alfonso Paso. Her last film appearances were supporting roles in three Puerto Rican/Mexican co-productions that were filmed in Puerto Rico, directed by her husband, and produced by her nephew Paquito.

After Fernando Cortés died, Mapy Cortés returned to Puerto Rico and led a relatively quiet life. In 1998 she died at her home of a heart attack. She was buried at the Puerto Rico Memorial Cemetery in Carolina, Puerto Rico.

Filmography
 Dos mujeres y un don Juan / Two Women and a don Juan (1933, Spain)
 El paraíso recobrado / The Recovered Paradise (1935, Spain)
 No me mates / Don't Kill Me (1935, Spain)
 El gato montés / The Wildcat (1936, Spain)
 ¡Centinela, alerta! / Guard, Alert!  (1936, Spain)
 El amor gitano / Gypsy Love (1936, Spain)
 Un tipo de suerte / A Lucky Guy (1938, Argentina)
 Ahora Seremos Felices / We Will Be Happy Now (1938, Cuba)
 Papá se desenreda / Dad Untangles (1940, Mexico)
 Cinco minutos de amor / Five Minutes of Love (1941, Mexico)
 ¡Ay, qué tiempos, señor don Simón! / Oh, What Times, Don Simon! (1941, Mexico)
 La liga de las canciones / The League of Songs (1941, Mexico)
 El gendarme desconocido / The Unknown Policeman (1941, Mexico)
 El conde de Monte Cristo / The Count of Monte Cristo (1942, Mexico)
 Las cinco noches de Adán / Adam's Five Nights (1942, Mexico)
 Seven Days' Leave (1942, United States)
 Yo bailé con Don Porfirio / I Danced with Don Porfirio (1942, Mexico)
 Internado para señoritas / Girls' Dormitory (1943, Mexico)
 El globo de Cantolla / Cantolla's Balloon (1943, Mexico)
 La guerra de los pasteles / The War of the Pastries (1943, Mexico)
 La corte del faraón / The Pharaoh's Court (1943, Mexico)
 La hija del regimiento / The Regiment's Daughter (1944, Mexico)
 La pícara Susana / Mischievous Susana (1945, Mexico)
 Un beso en la noche / A Kiss at Night (1945, Mexico)
 El amor las vuelve locas / Love Makes Them Crazy (1945, Mexico)
 Amor de una vida / Love of a Lifetime (1945, Mexico)
 El sexo fuerte / The Strong Sex (1945, Mexico)
 Los maridos engañan de 7 a 9 / Men Cheat from 7 to 9 (1946, Mexico)
 No te cases con mi mujer / Don't Marry My Wife (1946, Mexico)
 Al marido hay que seguirlo / A Husband Must Be Followed (1948, Argentina)
 Las tandas del Principal / The Shows at the Principal Theater (1949, Mexico)
 Recién casados... no molestar / Newlyweds.. Do Not Disturb (1950, Mexico)
 Venezuela también canta / Venezuela Also Sings (1951, Venezuela)
 Dormitorio para señoritas / Girls' Dormitory (1959, Mexico)
 Lamento borincano / Puerto Rican Lament (1963, Mexico/Puerto Rico co-production)
 En mi viejo San Juan / In My Old San Juan (1965, Mexico/Puerto Rico co-production)
 Luna de miel en Puerto Rico / Honeymoon in Puerto Rico (1966, Mexico/Puerto Rico co-production)

See also
List of Puerto Ricans

Bibliography
 
 Ortiz, Roberto Carlos. "Puerto Rican Sugar: The Transnational Film Career of Mapy Cortés." Centro Journal 17.1 (Spring 2005): 122-139.

References

External links 
WAM.UMB.EDU stars of the Mexican show business industry

1910 births
1998 deaths
Actresses from San Juan, Puerto Rico
Golden Age of Mexican cinema
Puerto Rican expatriates in Mexico
Puerto Rican film actresses
20th-century American actresses
21st-century Puerto Rican women singers